The Power of the Press is a 1928 American silent drama film directed by Frank Capra and starring Douglas Fairbanks Jr. as an aspiring newspaper reporter and Jobyna Ralston as a young woman suspected of murder.

In 2005, the film was selected for preservation in the United States National Film Registry by the Library of Congress as being "culturally, historically, or aesthetically significant".

In 1943, Columbia Pictures reused the title, without the leading The, for another newspaper picture, but it had a completely different plot and was not a remake.

Cast
Douglas Fairbanks Jr. as Clem Rogers
Jobyna Ralston as Jane Atwill
Mildred Harris as Marie Weston
Philo McCullough as Robert Blake
Wheeler Oakman as Van
Robert Edeson as City Editor
Edward Davis as Mr. John Atwill
Dell Henderson as Bill Johnson
Charles Clary as District Attorney Nye
Spottiswoode Aitken as Sports Writer
Frank Manning as Detective

References

External links

1928 films
American black-and-white films
Columbia Pictures films
1928 drama films
Films about journalists
Films directed by Frank Capra
American silent feature films
United States National Film Registry films
Silent American drama films
Films with screenplays by Sonya Levien
1920s American films